The Mad Pooper is the nickname given to an unidentified woman in Colorado Springs, Colorado, United States, who repeatedly defecated in public while jogging during the summer months of 2017. While she primarily targeted one family's property, she did not use it exclusively, leaving some of her excrement at other sites nearby. Photographs of her were made public, but neither she nor anyone who knows her came forward with further information that might identify her.

Police believed the woman's actions were intentional, since there are several public toilets within a block of the family's house that she could have used. After the case received national media attention, a purported spokesman claimed in a YouTube video that her actions were related to recent medical issues and enjoyed First Amendment protection; however that video turned out to be a hoax. Procter & Gamble offered her a free year's supply of its Charmin brand toilet paper if she turned herself in.

After a burst of news media coverage in mid-September, police reported that there had been no further reports of the woman defecating in public, although she had not been identified. A few commentators speculated about her possible motives. One believed she might suffer from Crohn's disease; another, in Psychology Today, proposed that she was an exhibitionist with poor impulse control taking revenge on the family who had caught her.

History
Cathy Budde says the defecations began in mid-July 2017, outside their house near the intersection of Briargate Boulevard and North Union Parkway in the northern end of Colorado Springs, Colorado. As she later told local TV station KKTV, her children came in one day and told her "There's a lady taking a poop!"

Budde was not sure they were serious, and went outside to see for herself. There she saw the woman, squatting, with her jogging shorts around her ankles. When Budde confronted the woman about having defecated in public and allowing the Budde children to see her private parts in the process, the woman said "Yeah ... sorry" and left after pulling up her shorts. Budde assumed she would return quickly to clean up the feces, and never again jog in the area due to the embarrassment the incident caused.

Instead, the Buddes found feces at the same spot on the sidewalk at least once a week. Paper napkins and wipes the jogger had used to clean herself were often nearby. On three occasions Budde saw the woman defecate. The Budde children began calling her "The Mad Pooper of Pine Creek" after a stream that flows through the neighborhood, sometimes used as its name.

"This is intentional", Budde told The Washington Post. There are, she explained, several public toilets nearby the woman could use. There is one across the street, portable toilets in a nearby public park, and some at a gas station a short distance away. All would be easy for the jogger to use if she regularly had the need while running. Neighbors also told Budde they had seen the woman defecating in their back yards as well as near a local Walgreens drugstore.

Budde notified the Colorado Springs Police Department (CSPD), and made attempts on her own to end the jogger's defecations. She took pictures from the house, capturing a short brown-haired woman in a gray tank top and shorts. She put up a printed paper sign at the place near her house favored by the jogger, warning her that the police were aware of the situation, and asking her to stop.

In response, Budde said, the woman began changing the times she jogged by. She also ignored the note's pleas, running by it 15 times in one day before defecating near it again, according to Budde. The police have said she could face charges of indecent exposure and public defecation were they to identify and arrest her, charges that, in the event of a conviction, might require that she register as a sex offender.

One officer, Lt. Howard Black, said he had never seen anything similar in his 35-year career in Colorado Springs. Like Budde, he admitted to the Post that it was amusing, but allowed for the possibility that the jogger might not be in full control of her actions. "If it's a mental health issue, she'll still be held accountable, but we would want to get her help."

In September, almost two months after the jogger's defecations had begun, Budde went to KKTV, which reported on the story. Shortly afterwards, the Post wrote its article, and the story went viral. Through its Twitter account, Procter & Gamble made an offer to the jogger: if she turned herself in to police, they would give her a year's supply of the company's Charmin toilet paper for free.

Runner's World magazine ran a story with a headline asking the woman to stop. "[A]s runners, we understand having a sudden emergency now and then. But when it becomes a habit, you need to change up your regimen." it wrote, giving readers the phone number for the CSPD to call if they believed they knew who the Mad Pooper was. The article further urged readers who might similarly be using public places to defecate on their runs to likewise stop. "Pull up your pants, and take your business elsewhere. We do not know what else to say."

Sports news website Deadspin called the CSPD about the case so frequently the department asked them to stop in early October since they had nothing new to report. Since then, police report, the woman appears to have stopped. However, despite the increase in publicity around the case the woman has not been identified.

Hoax spokesman

In response to the news coverage, a video was posted on YouTube by someone who claimed to be a family member of the jogger, who he called "Shirley". He said she was sorry for repeatedly fouling the Buddes' yard. However he also attributed her inability to control herself to a traumatic brain injury and complications from recent sex reassignment surgery.

Beyond that, however, he said it was irrelevant as she was not breaking any law. Her actions, he argued, were protected under the First Amendment, much like breastfeeding. Jeremy Loew, a criminal defense attorney consulted by Colorado Springs television station KRDO-TV emphatically rejected that claim. If the video truly was posted by "Shirley"'s family, Loew said, it was "actually the worst thing the[y] could do. ... Maybe they thought the videos would make the situation go away, but they won't." The spokesman might even find himself called as a witness, Loew added.

A few days later, the man posted a second video in which he disclosed that the first one was a hoax. He was later revealed to be DISOP TV, another YouTube user known for producing videos of flatulent pets, who admitted he made up the first video as "satire." Both that video and the original were soon deleted from the site.

Possible motives

Some news outlets went beyond reporting on the case to speculate as to what the reasons for the jogger's actions might be. Allison Feller, a writer for Women's Health, wondered if, like her, the Mad Pooper might be an avid runner who suffers from Crohn's disease, a bowel inflammation whose symptoms can sometimes include an inability to hold excrement long enough to reach a toilet. "[M]y first thought upon seeing this headline" she recalled, "was, 'Oh my god, being the subject of this story is my greatest fear.'"

Sometimes her disease left her in such pain as to be unable to run or even leave the house, Feller wrote. But when it did, she would experience symptoms very suddenly. "[Crohn's] can strike when you least expect it. And when that happens, my intestines go from totally chill to totally explosive faster than you can even think about where the closest available restroom may be."

Feller said she, too, took toilet paper and wipes with her every time she went for a run. "I don't run with these things because I'm planning to use them. I run with them because I've learned to be prepared." She recounted many times when, due to public bathrooms being closed or too distant for her to reach she had had to seclude herself behind trees or under bridges in order to defecate. One time, she admitted, she had even had to use her pants.

"In an age where everyone is armed with a cell-phone camera, I am terrified of someone seeing me going to the bathroom in an unapproved place, then snapping a photo or video, and posting it for the world to see, LOL at, and comment on", Feller wrote. She felt considerable shame over the way her disease inconvenienced her, and called the idea of experiencing public shaming on the Internet because of it "paralyzing". She warned readers who might not understand that feeling that they should not shame someone they see experiencing similar distress while running. "[O]ne day, you, too, may eat a burrito that doesn't agree with your stomach, and you may find yourself in a non-bathroom bathroom situation."

At Psychology Today, Dale Hartley, an associate professor of psychology at West Virginia University at Parkersburg, was dismissive of the idea that the Mad Pooper might suffer from an ailment that caused those problems, since she was so public in her defecations and had shown no sign of changing her routine to avoid having to do so. Nor did he think she had any psychosis, as she was "too put-together to be out of touch with reality" and kept to a regular schedule. "We would not expect to see consistently organized, predictable behaviors in someone who has undergone a psychotic break," Hartley wrote.

It was more likely, Hartley presumed, that some lesser psychological issues led to her actions. "Is she an exhibitionist?  I think this is closer to the truth", he wrote. But even if this was so, he believed, the jogger's real problem was impulse control disorder.

Her choice of the same location for so many of her defecations, Hartley also speculated, may have been retaliation against the Buddes for having caught her in the act.

Related incidents

United Airlines Flight 976
In October 1995, Wall Street investment banker Gerard Finneran, angry about being refused additional drinks while in first class on a flight from Buenos Aires to New York, left his seat and defecated from the top of a food cart in full view of staff and other passengers, later tracking his excrement through the cabin and wiping it on walls. He claimed that he was suffering from traveler's diarrhea and was prevented from using the bathroom by security for the Portuguese president, also in first class. As part of a later guilty plea he agreed to not only reimburse the airline for its cleanup costs but all his fellow passengers their airfare, which came to nearly $50,000.

The Newcastle Star Jumper
An instance was reported by the Newcastle Chronicle in the United Kingdom of a female jogger caught defecating on CCTV in the outskirts of Newcastle-upon-Tyne. Nicknamed the "Star Jumper" due to her performing star jumps after the act, she has not been identified.

The Lincoln Pooper
1011now reported an unknown female in Lincoln, Nebraska who had been caught on camera defecating outside a local swimming pool. Having been noted on multiple occasions to repeat the act before the pool opened and after it closed, at the time of the report she had yet to be identified.

The Brisbane Poo Jogger
News.com.au reported a 64-year-old male corporate executive nicknamed the "Poo Jogger" also caught on camera in Brisbane, Australia. The suspect was caught after residents banded together after suspected multiple instances and photographed the culprit in the act.   Attracting worldwide interest, he was charged with creating a public nuisance.

The New Jersey 'Pooperintendent'
CBS News reported that school staff of Holmdel High School in New Jersey had found human feces on their track "on a daily basis". Police later arrested Kenilworth Public Schools superintendent Thomas Tramaglini and charged him with lewdness, littering, and public defecation after he was caught defecating on the track. Tramaglini was dubbed the "Pooperintendent" by media and pled guilty to the charge of open defecation.

See also

2017 in the United States
Crime in Colorado
"Broadcast Wagstaff School News", a 2013 episode of the animated comedy series Bob's Burgers which featured a "Mad Pooper"
Runner's diarrhea, which has led to runners defecating in public
Bowel Movement Bandit

Notes

References

Unidentified American criminals
Criminals from Colorado
21st-century American criminals
American female criminals
Water supply and sanitation in the United States
Defecation
2017 in Colorado
July 2017 crimes in the United States
2010s in Colorado Springs, Colorado